The 2008 Vuelta a Murcia was the 24th edition of the Vuelta a Murcia cycle race and was held on 4 March to 8 March 2008. The race started in San Pedro del Pinatar and finished in Murcia. The race was won by Alejandro Valverde.

General classification

References

2008
2008 in road cycling
2008 in Spanish sport